Karin Säterkvist (born August 9, 1972 in Falun, Dalarna) is a Swedish cross-country skier who competed from 1992 to 1999. Competing in two Winter Olympics, she had her best finish of seventh in the 4 × 5 km relay at Albertville in 1992 and her best individual finish of 25th in the 15 km event at Nagano in 1998.

Säterkvist's best finish at the FIS Nordic World Ski Championships was 32nd in the 5 km + 10 km combined pursuit at Trondheim in 1997. Her best World Cup finish was 17th in an individual sprint event in Germany in 1996.

Säterkvist's best individual career finish was third twice at lower level events (1996, 1998).

Cross-country skiing results
All results are sourced from the International Ski Federation (FIS).

Olympic Games

World Championships

World Cup

Season standings

References

External links

Women's 4 x 5 km cross-country relay Olympic results: 1976-2002 

1972 births
Living people
People from Falun
Swedish female cross-country skiers
Cross-country skiers from Dalarna County
Cross-country skiers at the 1992 Winter Olympics
Cross-country skiers at the 1998 Winter Olympics
Olympic cross-country skiers of Sweden